Morgan Gurley Sanders (July 14, 1878 – January 7, 1956) was a U.S. Representative from Texas.

Born near Ben Wheeler, Texas, Sanders attended the public schools. He graduated from Alamo Institute and taught school for three years. He owned and published a weekly newspaper. He studied law at the University of Texas at Austin, was admitted to the bar in 1901, and commenced practice in Canton, Texas. He represented Canton as a member of the Texas House of Representatives for the 30th district from 1903 to 1907. He served as prosecuting attorney of Van Zandt County from 1910 to 1914, and as district attorney of the seventh judicial district of Texas in 1915 and 1916. After retiring as district attorney, he resumed the practice of law in Canton, Texas. He served as delegate to many Democratic State conventions.

Sanders was elected as a Democrat to the Sixty-seventh and to the eight succeeding Congresses (March 4, 1921 – January 3, 1939).

He was interred in Hillcrest Cemetery, Canton, Texas.

References

Sources

 
 
 

1878 births
1956 deaths
Burials in Texas
Democratic Party members of the Texas House of Representatives
County district attorneys in Texas
Democratic Party members of the United States House of Representatives from Texas
People from Van Zandt County, Texas
People from Canton, Texas